Acronicta menyanthidis, the light knot grass, is a moth of the family Noctuidae. It is distributed through northern, central and eastern Europe, east to Siberia and the Russian Far East.

The wingspan is 33–41 mm. Forewing bluish white, dusted and shaded with dark grey; a short black streak from near base; marginal area darker, sometimes blackish, grey; orbicular stigma quite small.- In the ab. suffusa Tutt the whole forewing is suffused with dark grey. - ab. obsoleta Tutt has the forewing quite pale with all markings faint; on the contrary ab. scotica Tuff from the west coast of Scotland is larger and brighter than the type, with all markings clear and distinct.

The adults fly at night from May to July . They are attracted to light.

The caterpillar is blackish brown with a red spiracular line with white dots. It feeds on moorland plants like bog myrtle and bilberry. Recorded food plants include Myrica, Calluna, Vaccinium, Salix, Betula, Ranunculus aconitifolius, Comarum palustre, Lysimachia nummularia and Menyanthes trifoliata.

The flight season refers to the British Isles. This may vary in other parts of the range.

References

External links 

 Light knot grass on UKmoths
 Moths and Butterflies of Europe and North Africa
 Fauna Europaea
 Acronicta menyanthidis on noctuidae.net
 Lepiforum.de

Acronicta
Moths of Europe
Moths of Asia
Moths described in 1789
Taxa named by Eugenius Johann Christoph Esper